Attila is a genus of tropical passerine birds, the attilas. They belong to the tyrant flycatcher family.  The species in this genus have large heads and hooked bills; they are markedly predatory and aggressive for their size – hence the scientific and common names, which refer to Attila the Hun.

The genus contains seven species:

Some authorities, either presently or formerly, recognize additional species as belonging to the genus Attila including the red-tailed bristlebill (as Dasycephala syndactyla)

References

Further reading
 Hilty, Steven L. (2003): Birds of Venezuela. Christopher Helm, London. 
 Stiles, F. Gary & Skutch, Alexander Frank (1989): A guide to the birds of Costa Rica. Comistock, Ithaca. 

 
Bird genera
Tyrannidae

Taxa named by René Lesson